Floop may refer to:

 FlooP, a programming language
 Fegan Floop, a character in the Spy Kids series of films
 FLOOPS, Florida Object Oriented Process Simulator, in semiconductor process simulation
 Floops, a cartoon character created for the VRML language at SGI website

See also
 Flop (disambiguation)